This is a list of Greek princesses from the accession of George I to the throne of the Kingdom of Greece in 1863. Individuals holding the title of princess would usually also be styled "Her Royal Highness"  (HRH), except in the case of the two daughters of Prince Michael, who hold no style, and only bare the title of Princess of Greece.

List of Greek princesses since 1863

 
Princesses
Princesses